Arp or ARP may refer to:

People
 Andrice Arp (born 1969), U.S. comics artist and illustrator
 Bill Arp, (1826-1903) Charles Henry Smith, US writer and politician.
 Halton Arp (1927–2013), American astronomer
 Arp catalogue of galaxies
 Fiete Arp (born 2000), German footballer
 Jean Arp (1886–1966) or Hans Arp, German-French artist
 Robert Arp (born 1970), American philosopher
 Sophie Taeuber-Arp (1889–1943), Swiss artist

Places in the United States
 Arp, Georgia
 Arp, Tennessee
 Arp, Texas

Businesses and organizations
 ARP (laboratory) of digital humanities
 Adaptation Reporting Power, under the UK 2008 Climate Change Act
 Amphibious Reconnaissance and Patrol Unit, a Tawain special forces group 
 Air Raid Precautions, a UK civil defence 1924–1946
 Airport reference point, a designated geographical location
 Anti-Revolutionary Party (Dutch Anti-Revolutionaire Partij), a defunct Dutch political party
 Assembly of the Representatives of the People, Tunisian government
 Associate Reformed Presbyterian Church, US
 Association for Research in Personality, US

Music
 ARP Instruments, Inc., a former electronic musical instrument maker
 Arpeggiator, on sound synthesizers and electronic organs
 "Arp", a song by Apoptygma Berzerk The Apopcalyptic Manifesto 
 "Arp", a song by Arcane Roots from Melancholia Hymns
 "Faust Arp", a song by Radiohead from their album In Rainbows
 "Arp #1", a song by French artist Jackson and His Computerband from his album Glow. It features in 2013's Grand Theft Auto V on Soulwax FM.

Technology
 Active rollover protection
 Address Resolution Protocol, a communication protocol
 ARP spoofing, a networking attack
 Autoradiopuhelin (car radio phone), a Finnish mobile phone network

Other uses
 American Rescue Plan Act of 2021
 arp, the ISO 639-3 code for the Arapaho language, a Native American language
 Arp, a rosemary cultivar
 arp, actin-related protein (e.g. Arp10)
 Arp2/3 complex, a protein
 Arc routing, where ARP refers to Arc Routing Problem.

See also
 AARP